Edward Cronjager (March 21, 1904 – June 15, 1960) was an American cinematographer. His film career began in 1925, with Womanhandled, and ended in 1961 with The Devil's Partner, although he died over a year prior to the film's opening in Atlanta. Within this 35-year career, Cronjager was the director of photography on 117 feature films (listed here), as well as many short films. On every film he was the cinematographer, or a co-cinematographer.

Filmography

External links

American filmographies
American cinematographers